The 2018–19 West Region Premiership was the first season of the West Region Premiership the newly named and expanded top tier of league competition for SJFA West Region member clubs, and the 17th season since the West Region began in 2002. It was the first season after the reconstruction of the West Region into four regionwide divisions.

The league consisted of 16 clubs, 10 from the 2017–18 West of Scotland Super League Premier Division, four from the 2017–18 West of Scotland Super League First Division and the two play-off winners.

Auchinleck Talbot won the title on 15 May 2019 after a 5–0 win over Troon. As champions they entered the preliminary round of the 2019–20 Scottish Cup.

Teams

Member clubs for the 2018–19 season
Beith were the defending champions.

Petershill, Cambuslang Rangers, Largs Thistle and Renfrew were promoted from the old West of Scotland Super League First Division to allow the new division to expand from 12 to 16 teams.

Irvine Meadow and Troon claimed the final spots after beating Arthurlie and Girvan respectively in the West Region League play-offs.

1 Groundsharing with Maryhill.
2 Groundsharing with Cumbernauld United.

Managerial changes

League table

Results

References

6
SJFA West Region Premiership seasons